Notiophilus  aestuans is a species of ground beetle native to Europe.

References

External links
Images representing Notiophilus aestuans  at Barcode of Life Data System

Notiophilus
Beetles described in 1864
Beetles of Europe